Isaiah Likely (born April 18, 2000) is an American football tight end for the Baltimore Ravens of the National Football League (NFL). He played college football at Coastal Carolina.

Early life and high school
Likely grew up in Cambridge, Massachusetts and attended Malden High School before transferring to Everett High School for his senior year. As a junior, he caught 59 passes for 917 yards with 11 touchdowns.

College career
As a freshman in the 2018 season, Likely caught 12 passes for 106 yards and five touchdowns in seven games. He was named third-team All-Sun Belt Conference after finishing his sophomore season with 32 receptions for 431 receiving yards and five touchdowns. He had six receptions for 107 yards and a touchdown in the 24–21 victory over Texas State in the Chanticleers' last game. Likely was named first-team All-Sun Belt and a second-team All-American by Pro Football Focus after catching 30 passes for 601 yards and five touchdowns as a junior. He had three receptions for 118 yards and a touchdown in a 34–23 victory over Appalachian State. During his senior year, Likely was named the Sun Belt Player of the Week after catching eight passes for 232 yards and four touchdowns in a 52–20 win over Arkansas State. Likely tied the NCAA record for longest touchdown reception on his first of the four touchdowns with a 99-yard reception. He repeated as a first-team All-Sun Belt selection after catching 59 passes for 912 yards and a team-high 12 touchdowns. Likely led the Sun Belt in receiving touchdowns n the 2021 season.

Collegiate statistics

Professional career

Likely was selected by the Baltimore Ravens in the fourth round, 139th overall, of the 2022 NFL Draft. He caught his first NFL touchdown against the Tampa Bay Buccaneers in Week 8 of the 2022 season on Thursday Night Football. In Week 18, he had eight receptions for 103 receiving yards in the 27–16 loss to the Cincinnati Bengals. In his rookie season, he appeared in 16 games, of which he started two. He finished with 36 receptions for 373 receiving yards and three receiving touchdowns.

References

External links

Baltimore Ravens bio
Coastal Carolina Chanticleers bio

Living people
American football tight ends
Coastal Carolina Chanticleers football players
Players of American football from Massachusetts
Sportspeople from Cambridge, Massachusetts
2000 births
Baltimore Ravens players